The East Fork of the East Branch of the Saco River is a  stream in the White Mountains of New Hampshire in the United States. It is a tributary of the East Branch of the Saco River, with its waters ultimately flowing to the Atlantic Ocean in Maine.

The stream flows south, entering the town of Jackson, and joins the East Branch of the Saco in a broad valley between Sable Mountain to the east and Black Mountain to the west.

See also

List of rivers of New Hampshire

References

Rivers of New Hampshire
Saco River
Rivers of Carroll County, New Hampshire